Yellow wine may refer to:
 Vin jaune, a type of French white wine from the Jura region
 Huangjiu, a type of Chinese alcoholic beverage made from a variety of grains